Martin James Brown (27 February 1900 – 13 June 1988) was an Australian rules footballer who played with South Melbourne in the Victorian Football League (VFL).

See also
 1927 Melbourne Carnival

Notes

External links 

1900 births
1988 deaths
Australian rules footballers from Melbourne
Sydney Swans players
People from Richmond, Victoria